Ercilia López de Blomberg (1865–1962) was a poet, essayist and novelist from Paraguay. She had major patriotist influences with her works in Paraguay.

Biography

Refuge to Buenos Aires 
Ercilia Blomberg was born on 11 August 1865. She was the daughter of the war minister Venancio Lopez, and the granddaughter of the president of Paraguay – Carlos Antonio López. When she was three years old, she and her mother left the capital of Paraguay. Meanwhile, her father Venancio Lopez died before the hecatomb of Cerro Cora, mainly due to torture.

Her uncle was shot in Lomas Valentinas during the last stages of the war in 1868. Along with her brothers and her mother, at the age of three they relocated to Buenos Aires, fleeing from Paraguay to Argentina. She studied in a private school, learning English.

Return to Paraguay 
Ercilia's mother, Mrs. Manuela, was in very poor health and returned to Paraguay, and later she came to hear of her death in 1880. In June 1879, Ercilia wrote a poem which was published in the "El Comercio" newspaper, which was patriotically named "To Paraguay". She married Hector Pedro Blomberg, who later left her a widow and completely dedicated herself to raising her children at the time.

Don Inca 
Don Inca, her autobiography, is considered her most valued work during the years. It is a dramatic reflection of her life. Moreover, there is a series of historical events depicted in the writing.

Later, in 1921, she published an essay about the Guarani language, in which she grew to have vast knowledge of the subject.

Blomberg passed away in 1962, at 97 years of age.

References 

1865 births
1962 deaths
Paraguayan women poets
Paraguayan poets